Organization for Mine Clearance and Afghan Rehabilitation (OMAR) is the chief organisation in the awareness and removal of mines in Afghanistan. It was founded in 1990 and initially operated in the western provinces of Afghanistan, it has since branched out to the rest of the country. 

In early 2002 the Mines Advisory Group (MAG) responded to OMAR's request for specialist training necessary to address the new types of UXO being found in Afghanistan following coalition activity in the area.

Mine warfare and mine clearance organizations
Military of Afghanistan
Modern history of Afghanistan
Organizations established in 1990
20th century in Afghanistan
21st century in Afghanistan